Vincent Figgins (1766 – 29 February 1844) was a British typefounder based in London, who cast and sold metal type for printing. After an apprenticeship with typefounder Joseph Jackson, he established his own type foundry in 1792. His company was extremely successful and, with its range of modern serif faces and display typefaces, had a strong influence on the styles of British printing in the nineteenth century. 

Figgins introduced or popularised both slab-serif and sans-serif typefaces, which have since become two of the main genres of typeface. He was also involved in local politics as a Councilman of the City of London.

Family and early life

Figgins was born in 1766 and started his career as an apprentice to the typefounder Joseph Jackson. He worked for Jackson from 1782 until Jackson's death in 1792. According to Reed, Figgins was largely the manager of Jackson's foundry from about 1790 onwards due to Jackson's poor health. 

His wife was Elizabeth and he had sons Vincent, James, later an alderman and MP, Henry and four daughters.

Career
The main historical sources for Figgins' career are:
 the specimens he issued of the typefaces that he sold, which were first sheets and later books as his business expanded.
Literary Anecdotes of the Eighteenth Century (1812), by his friend and patron the antiquarian and printer John Nichols 
 Thomas Curson Hansard's textbook on printing Typographia (1825), published towards the end of Figgins' career
A History of The Old English Letter Foundries by Talbot Baines Reed (1887), who knew Figgins' grandson

On Jackson's death, Figgins wanted to take the foundry over but could not afford to; it was instead purchased by William Caslon III. A member of the prominent Caslon typefounding family, he was seeking to set up a foundry independent of the Caslon foundry established by his grandfather William Caslon I. (Soon after taking over the Jackson foundry Caslon went bankrupt, although he was apparently able to rebuild the business until his retirement in 1807.)

Nichols, who believed in Figgins' talent, encouraged Figgins to open his own foundry. 

Figgins would many years later write to Nichols to thank him for his generosity during the beginning of his career:
I am greatly obliged to you for the very flattering mention of my name, but you have not done yourself the justice to record your own kindness to me: that, on Mr. Jackson's death, finding I had not the means to purchase the foundry, you encouraged me to make a beginning. You gave me large orders and assisted me with the means of executing them; and during a long and difficult struggle in pecuniary matters for fifteen years, you, my dear Sir, never refused me your assistance, without which I must have given it up. Do mention this—that, as the first Mr. Bowyer was the means of establishing Mr. Caslon—his son, Mr. Jackson—it may be known that Vincent Figgins owes his prosperity to Mr. Bowyer's successor.

Figgins' foundry was established at White Swan Yard, Holborn, moving in 1801 to West Street, Smithfield. (Neither address survives, having been replaced by Holborn Viaduct and Charterhouse Street respectively.) He was also commissioned by Oxford University Press (OUP) for work such as carefully repairing matrices for a sixteenth-century Greek typeface.

An early commission was to make a facsimile type for Macklin's Bible, commissioned by Thomas Bensley. The original type for the book was cut by Jackson, and Bensley decided to buy new type which matched the original. Instead of going to Caslon, who had Jackson's matrices, he asked Figgins. Figgins was able to make a perfect recreation of the type. He then worked on a similar job to finish the Double Pica (22-point size) type in Robert Bowyer’s edition of David Hume's The History of England which was being worked on by Jackson at the time of his death. Another early client was the luxury printer Peltro William Tomkins.

Figgins' company issued specimens of his types from 1793, first as sheets and later in book form. Examination of watermarks indicates that Figgins continued to use a dated title page for some years while changing the content of the book, so these were often later than the title page date. His sons also issued a specimen in 1838, soon after taking over management on Figgins' retirement, and in 1845. Berthold Wolpe edited a reprint of his 1801 and 1815 specimens published by the Printing Historical Society. According to Nichols' son John Bowyer Nichols, Figgins was "an amiable and worthy man, and was generally respected."

Perhaps the most bizarre aspect of Figgins' career was its beginning, in which one of his tasks was to finish a Greek type begun by Jackson for Oxford University Press. Typefaces at this time were made by cutting the letterforms to be printed as steel punches. This was done by a punchcutter, a skilled engraver. Vincent Figgins II in 1855 wrote that his father's career began in this way:
The mystery thrown over the operations of a Type-foundry, within my own recollection (thirty-four years), and the still greater secrecy which had existed in my father's experience, testifies that the art had been perpetuated by a kind of Druidic or Masonic induction from the first. An anecdote of my father's early struggles may illustrate this. At the death of Mr. Joseph Jackson, whom my father had served ten years as apprentice and foreman, there was in progress for the University Press of Oxford a new fount of Double Pica [22-point size] Greek, which had progressed under my father's entire management. The then delegates of that Press – the Rev. Dr. Randolph and the Rev. W. Jackson – suggested that Mr Figgins should finish the fount himself. This, with other offers of support from those who had previously known him, was the germ of his prosperity (which was always gratefully acknowledged). But when he had undertaken this work, the difficulty presented itself that he did not know where to find the punch-cutter. No one knew his address; but he was supposed to be a tall man, who came in a mysterious way occasionally, whose name no one knew, but he went by the sobriquet of 'The Black Man'. This old gentleman, a very clever mechanic, lived to be a pensioner on my father's bounty—gratitude is perhaps the better word. I knew him and could never understand the origin of his sobriquet, unless Black was meant for dark, mysterious, from the manner of his coming and going from Mr. Jackson's foundry.

Wolpe investigated the topic of Figgins' engravers in the 1960s, finding that the Stephenson Blake foundry of Sheffield had a copy of his c. 1815 specimen with annotations noting the cutters of some types in pencil, suggesting that Figgins often commissioned work from two engravers about whom little is known named Perry and Edmonston. Wolpe noted that a Perry also cut a type for the Caslon foundry and suggested that Edmonston, who lived at Alfred Place, Cambridge Heath, is the same man as the punchcutter recorded as Edmiston who cut an extremely small 4.5pt Greek type for the Caslon foundry, known from 1828, according to Bowman "so small that its clarity is remarkable". Wolpe concluded, however, that "who the mysterious 'Black Man'...was, we may never be able to find out." 

John H. Bowman in his research on the history of printing Greek in Britain concluded that Figgins' account did not match Figgins or OUP's known Greek types: "I have not found anything answering its description. It may be that it is a mistake [for another, Great Primer or 18pt, font] or indeed perhaps the difficulties of finding "the Black Man" were such that the type was never completed. I do not believe it can be the Double Pica that appears in Figgins' later specimens [see below], for the style of that type would have been impossible at this early date." 

A Charles Perry is documented in news articles of the late 1820s as a punchcutter for Figgins. His career was halted by tragedy: on 6 December 1829, drunk and arguing with his common-law wife, he threw an iron at her and hit their son who was in his mother's arms, breaking his son's skull and killing him. He received a year's imprisonment.

Politics

Besides his business career, Figgins was a Common Councilman for the ward of Farringdon Without of the City of London. 

In 1828 the Radical candidate Henry Hunt and journalist William Cobbett ran against him in the multi-candidate seat, running on a campaign of investigating how the City's funds were used. Cobbett's  Political Register reported a rowdy meeting on 26 December 1828 which degenerated into arguments, stating that Hunt said (speech is reported):
His opponent, Mr Figgins [visited pot-houses where] it was a constant practice to sing songs of the most beastly and indecent description...songs that would almost make humanity shudder and yet these songs were allowed and applauded, and his opponent, Mr. Figgins, sat and laughed at them until his old rotten teeth almost dropped out of his head. He [Mr. Hunt] had heard that songs were sung at these houses that would not be tolerated by the lowest prostitutes that visited the Finish...[In response] Mr. Figgins never appeared before them with so much pleasure. It was an honour to him to have the abuse of this shameless fellow. (Loud murmuring and hisses.) After some considerable time, he proceeded, and accused Mr. Hunt of having turned away his own wife, and of having seduced the wife of Colonel Vince.–(Cries of "Off, off!") Mr. Hunt was infirm in talent as in virtue, and would they think of sending a detestable adulterer to represent them?...Mr. Hunt [said that] as to Mr. Figgins' attack regarding the female alluded to, it was a mere cowardly attack on a woman. Mr. Figgins asked if it were not true! Mr. Hunt replied that such a question was never put in any other Court than the Spanish Inquisition. As to Mr. Figgins ever being guilty of such an offence–why no man would ever suspect him; the very appearance of the man was a denial to the charge.
The article reported that "a good deal more personal altercation" followed.

Ultimately Cobbett withdrew before the election and Hunt lost; Cobbett's contemporary biographer Robert Huish claimed that "from the beginning of the meeting to the end it was one tissue of abuse uttered against Hunt and Cobbett [while Figgins and his allies] received from the two sturdy radicals some heavy blows...it is scarcely necessary to remark that neither of the radicals was successful...Mr. Hunt soon saw that he was no great favourite with the good people of that part of the city." Figgins came eighth in the poll and was one of the sixteen elected out of eighteen candidates; Hunt came last. Hunt's campaign attracted considerable attention, and a book was published the following year anthologising the events of the campaign "which has excited considerable interest in the public mind of the City."

Figgins also reportedly advised in a meeting of 4 October 1827 against sending nightwatchmen out patrol and supported the traditional approach that they waited in watchboxes, because (speech again reported):
if the watchman goes to sleep in his box, when you want him you know where to find him, but on the altered plan proposed, in case of an accident, there would be to seek him through half the public-houses in the ward, and if you only sought him in half, just an even chance against finding him when all was done.
In 1829 William Heath published a cartoon, "The charleys [nightwatchmen] in grief or the funeral of the city watch boxe's" showing a procession of nightwatchmen protesting against the change with a banner of "Figgins for ever".

Typefaces
Under the pyrotechnics of Figgins' display faces, his body text faces, the types he first sold, have received less attention. His earliest faces, some being copies of earlier designs, are in the late "transitional" style, with affinities to faces such as Caslon, Baskerville and its copy by the Fry Foundry, Bulmer and Bell. Nicolas Barker felt that Figgins' early types "constitute the largest and best of the 'transitional' group, in which the genius of Bodoni was most effectively translated into English." His later text faces are very clearly in the modern or Didone style, which became popular around the close of the eighteenth century. It has a sharper transition between thick and thin strokes and a more modular, geometric design. Reed speculates that "within a few years of the establishment of his foundry, the public taste...experienced a complete revolution...the circumstance may possibly account for the somewhat remarkable absence of any specimen bearing his name for a lengthened period [up to 1815]." Matthew Carter designed a digital font based on his type for Bensley under the name of "Vincent Text" for Newsweek, introduced in 1999.

The second part of Figgins' career, from around 1805, coincided with the rise of the mass-market printed poster and an increasing need for dramatic display typefaces. A new technology of the "Sanspareil" matrix, moulds made by riveting a cut-out letterform to a backing plate, made casting these types easier and more crisp than earlier casting in sand.

Although Hansard perhaps over-optimistically felt in 1825 that Figgins had "strayed less into the folly of fat-faced, preposterous disproportions, than either Thorne, Fry or Caslon," the other leading London typefounders of the time, Figgins came to sell many innovative, aggressive designs. What Figgins thought of his foundry's designs and the motivations behind them is not known; his specimens do not comment on the types shown. Librarian and historian James Mosley, the leading contemporary expert on Figgins' career, suggests that the "unusually large range of lighter types" in his specimens suggest some reservations on his part towards the ultra-bold styles of the period, as does the line in his 1823 specimen book that asks the question "The increased fatness in JOB-LETTER is an improvement, but is it not in many cases carried to an extreme?" In 2014, graphic designer Leila Singleton commented "sure, Vincent Figgins was an important figure in the history of type, but let's face it -- his letterforms were imbalanced and hideous."

Figgins was one of the first typefounders to sell "fat face" ultra-bold typefaces. These were serif faces based on the model of Didone letterforms, but with much bolder verticals. Matthew Carter's Elephant (also known as "Big Figgins"), bundled with some Microsoft software, is inspired by the Figgins' fat faces. He also offered a backslanted design, the first known.

Figgins is the first known typefounder to have released a slab-serif typeface, a style of typeface with thick block "slab" serifs at the ends of the strokes. His first caps-only type first appeared, under the name of Antique, in a specimen dated 1815 but containing paper with 1817 watermarks. It was probably based on earlier lettering models: Justin Howes found very similar lettering printed from a woodblock on an 1810 lottery advertisement.

Opinions of the design varied from Nicolete Gray's view of the slab-serif as "the most brilliant typographical innovation of the nineteenth century", to Hansard showing it among other "typographic monstrosities!!!". In recent times, Hoefler & Frere-Jones described his slab serif as lumpy: "[it] gives the impression that its designer simply began with one letter and worked his way through the alphabet until the project was complete, never stopping to articulate the design's policies or anticipate any problems. In many ways, this design is two typefaces, its uppercase and lowercase being almost wholly unrelated." Both Mosley and Hoefler and Frere-Jones highlighted the perfectly circular, unstressed "O" as a part of the design which was abandoned in later slab-serifs, although Mosley describes it as "more logical" than vertical-stress designs that replaced it and felt that the type "suffers from being a pioneer design". Slab serifs proliferated during the nineteenth century, using alternative names including "Egyptian", "Ionics" and "Clarendons". 

In 1828 Figgins became the second typefounder to sell a face of sans-serif capitals, and quickly introduced a large range of sizes. Sans-serifs had become popular in lettering in previous decades and one typeface cut without apparent success (no uses are known). In Walter Tracy's view "he made the style a reality", and for Mosley this "brought the design into typography". Figgins also introduced the name "sans-serif", not previously attested. The style had before been called "Egyptian" or "old Roman" characters. 

Figgins first showed a sans-serif, a quite bold design of normal width, in 1828, before quickly releasing a large range of sizes from 1832 onwards. David Ryan felt that the design was "cruder but much larger" than its predecessor, making it a success. Many of his later sans-serifs were extremely condensed, apparently on the model of a Thorowgood face first known from about 1830.

Figgins also sold shadowed faces, and blackletter faces in inline and double-inline versions. One type of typeface Figgins did not so much sell was decorated types with a pattern or artwork inside the letter, of a kind popular in France and particularly sold by Louis John Pouchée in London. He did issue a small decorated "Tuscan" (typeface with branching serifs) in the 1810s. Figgins' later ornaments were in a weighty style complementary to his typefaces.

Figgins sold many non-roman types, according to Hansard Greek, Hebrew, Irish, Persian, Saxon, Syriac and Telugu by 1825. Hansard commented in 1825 that "no foundry existing is better stocked with these extraneous sorts...astronomical, geometrical, algebraical, physical, genealogical and arithmetical sorts". In 1825 he was hired by the linguist John Gilchrist to produce type for his proposed "Universal Character", a phonetic alphabet intended for transcribing foreign languages. He also offered a Pica-size face of Bengali, according to Fiona Ross "perhaps the first to be cut on a commercial basis". Figgins' later ornaments were in a weighty style complementary to his typefaces.

Figgins' Greek typefaces are first shown in a specimen of 1815; at this time most were in the "old style" descending from the Grecs du roi; one was more in the Porson style. According to Bowman the next specimen (with an 1821 title page but some leaves dated 1822) has more types in the Porson style although one influenced by a type from the Wilson foundry.  Bowman wrote of the Great Primer and Pica no. 3 of this specimen that "I think they are the most beautiful Greek type ever devised" and that his foundry became "the most important in the production of Greek type in England".

Retirement and later life
Figgins ran his foundry until 1836 when he retired to live at 1 Prospect Place, Peckham Rye. He transferred his foundry to his two eldest sons, Vincent Figgins of Southgate and James Figgins, who issued a first specimen book under their own name in 1838. James Figgins (1811–1884) was elected to Parliament in 1868 as an MP for Shrewsbury.

Figgins died on 29 February 1844 at Peckham Rye, and is buried in Nunhead Cemetery in a memorial shared with his wife Elizabeth, sons Vincent and James Figgins and Vincent's wife Rosanna. The memorial is now Grade II listed. The second Vincent Figgins is also commemorated at his local church, Christ Church, Southgate.

Legacy

Figgins' foundry moved to 3–7 Ray Street, Clerkenwell in 1865, and adjacent buildings on Farringdon Road. The building survives, and is also Grade II listed as one of the few surviving type foundry buildings in London. It still retains the original cast iron railings bearing the monogram VJF (Vincent & James Figgins). For some years the headquarters of Guardian Unlimited, as of 2017 it is the headquarters of Company Pictures. Besides type the company also made a boxed Kriegsspiel set in type metal. While Figgins' types were influential in design, the types themselves were little used by the late nineteenth century: from the mid-century larger metal types were largely displaced in use by pantograph-engraved wood type, being much lighter and easier to handle, although the company continued to hold the matrices into the 1950s.

By the late nineteenth century it was clear that for large-run printing of body text the future was hot metal typesetting, which cast fresh new type for each printing job, and in the case of the Linotype machine cast each line in rigid blocks. In 1897 James Figgins commented "the Lino is ruining us entirely". The styles of Figgins' work also became less popular around the beginning of the twentieth century, with new Art Nouveau-influenced display type designs and greater interest in the styles of earlier centuries. 

However, there was a attracted attention from the Victoriana revival of interest in nineteenth-century typography from the 1930s onwards, with coverage of his work from Nicolete Gray and use of nineteenth-century styles by figures such as Robert Harling and John Betjeman. These styles were also used in the design of the post-war Festival of Britain.

In 1907 Figgins' company passed to James Figgins' nephew, R. H. Stevens, and by 1909 it had moved to 89 Southwark Street, also listed. In 1933 it merged with another typefounding company, P. M. Shanks and Co., to form the new company Stevens, Shanks & Sons Ltd., which carried on as a going but slowly declining business casting metal type into the 1970s.

The materials of Figgins' foundry were acquired by St Bride Library, London, in 1968–73, along with others from Stevens Shanks,  through the work of James Mosley, then its librarian. Mosley briefly worked at Stevens Shanks in the 1950s and has written articles and given talks on Figgins' work. According to Mosley some of the largest matrices were sold for scrap by the 1950s, and some damaged by unwise attempts to cast type from them in the twentieth century using high-pressure modern casting equipment, but many of Figgins' materials are extant and have been used for research, for example by the digital font company Commercial Type and its co-founder Paul Barnes.

Numerous digital fonts have been published based on Figgins' work.

Notes

References

Cited literature

External links
 "1821" specimen (contains leaves dated 1822 and 1823)
 Specimen of Printing Types by Vincent Figgins, Letter Founder, 1834
 Vincent & James Figgins: Specimen book, 1845. Published by Figgins' sons who took over his foundry on his retirement in 1836; dated to the year after Vincent Figgins' death. It showcases many different decorative typefaces of the period, including some notable ornamented designs.
 V&J Figgins specimen, 1858?
 Specimen book of types by V. & J. Figgins, c. 1897, digitisation: Noord-Hollands Archief
 Type Founding and Printing During the 19th Century (1900), a book by Vincent Figgins' grandson James.
 James Mosley's Gallery of Figgins designs and memorabilia.

English typographers and type designers
1766 births
1844 deaths
Burials at Nunhead Cemetery
Councilmen of the City of London
Letterpress font foundries of the United Kingdom